Biddle v. Perovich, 274 U.S. 480 (1927), was a United States Supreme Court case in which the Court held that under his power "to grant reprieves and pardons for offenses against the United States" (Article II, Section 2), the President may commute a sentence of death to life imprisonment without the convict's consent. Burdick v. United States, 236 U.S. 79, limited page 274 U.S. 486. Response to a certificate of questions from the circuit court of appeals, arising upon review of a judgment of the district court in habeas corpus discharging Perovich from the Leavenworth Penitentiary.

External links 

 

United States Supreme Court cases
1927 in United States case law
United States clemency case law
Recipients of American presidential clemency
United States Supreme Court cases of the Taft Court